Nango Shah, aka Nanga Shah or Goth Nago Shah, is a village and deh in Tando Muhammad Khan taluka of Tando Muhammad Khan District, Sindh. As of 2017, it has a population of 14,956, in 2,672 households. It part of the tapedar circle of Lakhat.

References 

Populated places in Tando Muhammad Khan District